Jaegung-dong is a neighbourhood in Gunpo, Gyeonggi, South Korea. It is the location of the Gunpo city hall.

External links
 Jaegung-dong 

Neighbourhoods in Gunpo